Jarno Heinikangas (born 5 March 1979) is a retired Finnish football player.

References
 Guardian Football

External links
  Profile at TPS homepage
 

Finnish footballers
FC Jazz players
Turun Palloseura footballers
Veikkausliiga players
1979 births
Living people
Association football midfielders
Finland international footballers
Sportspeople from Pori